Arrowhead Lake is the name of several lakes in Ontario, Canada.

The lakes are located in the following districts (west to east):
Kenora District 
Thunder Bay District 
Algoma District  
Muskoka District

See also
List of lakes in Ontario

References
 National Resources Canada

Lakes of Kenora District
Lakes of Algoma District
Lakes of the District Municipality of Muskoka
Lakes of Thunder Bay District